Petty officer second class is the fifth enlisted rank in the U.S. Navy  and the U.S. Coast Guard, just above petty officer third class and below petty officer first class, and is a non-commissioned officer. It is equivalent to the rank of sergeant in the Army and Marine Corps, and staff sergeant in the Air Force.

Overview
Similar to petty officer third class, advancement to petty officer second class is dependent on time in service, performance evaluations by superiors, and rate (technical specialty) examinations.  The advancement cycle is currently every 6 months.  Only a certain number of billets (job openings for this rate) open up biannually and all third-class petty officers compete.  The top scorers are chosen for advancement, but only in sufficient quantities to fill the billets available.

Job description
Petty Officers serve a dual role as both technical experts and as leaders.  Unlike the sailors below them, there is no such thing as an "undesignated Petty Officer."  Every Petty Officer has both a rate (rank) and rating (job, similar to an MOS in other branches).  A Petty Officer's full title is a combination of the two.  Thus, a Petty Officer Second Class, who has the rating of interior communications electrician would properly be called an Interior Communications Electrician, Second Class.  The term Petty Officer is, then, only used in abstract, the general sense, when referring to a group of Petty Officers of different ratings, or when the Petty Officer's rating is unknown. Often, the Petty Officer is just referred to by the shorthand designation, without using the surname. Thus EM2 Reyes would just be called EM2. A Petty Officer Second Class may be generically referred to as PO2 when the sailor's rating is not known, although some prefer to be called simply "Petty Officer (Martinez)."  To address a Petty Officer, one would say, "Petty Officer Meyer", "Meyer", or "Sailor" (the latter two forms being acceptable for use by those equal or greater in rate than the Petty Officer unless in a familiar setting, such as by those who work closely with the Petty Officer). It is uncommon to address a petty officer as simply "Petty Officer", the way one might address an NCO in the Marine Corps as "Sergeant". Also acceptable, but archaic, would be to address a Petty Officer or Chief Petty Officer of any grade as "Mister Meyer" or "Ms. Meyer". The use of "Ms." or "Mister" is commonly only in reference to junior commissioned officers or warrant officers.

Short form naming
Each rating has an official abbreviation, such as GM for gunner's mate, BU for builder, or BM for boatswain's mate.  When combined with the petty officer level, this gives the shorthand for the petty officer's rate, such as IT2 for "information systems technician second class".  It is common practice to refer to the petty officer by this shorthand in all but the most formal correspondence (such as printing and inscription on awards). Unlike most rates, the Aircrew survival equipmentman rate uses their former title of parachute rigger for abbreviation and are still referred as PRs and parachute riggers in the military community after undergoing a rating name change in 1986.

Promotion system
The Navy uses promotion points that they call "final multiple score" system, which considers the whole person by calculating a candidate's performance, experience, and knowledge into the individual's final multiple score. To advance a candidate must meet the time in rate eligibility, pass the advancement test, and have a final multiple higher than the minimum required to advance.

Among enlisted sailors, 12 consecutive years of good conduct (categorized as no court-martial convictions and no non-judicial punishments) entitles the sailor to wear a good conduct variation of their rate insignia: the chevrons which are normally red are replaced with gold.  The perched eagle remains silver. However, the high year tenure initiative mandates that a petty officer second class may only have 16 years of service. If a PO2 fails to make petty officer first class within that time, the petty officer is involuntarily separated for not meeting advancement requirements. However, this may be waived in the event the sailor holds a critical rate, Navy Enlisted Classification or security clearance.

Uniform
All U.S. Coast Guard petty officers wear red chevrons and red service stripes, until the rate of chief petty officer, where both chevrons and service stripes are gold.

In the US Navy, all petty officers wear red stripes and chevrons until they reach 12 consecutive years of service with good conduct (as determined by eligibility for the Navy Good Conduct Medal as its criteria).

See also
 Petty officer
 U.S. Navy enlisted rate insignia
 Comparative military ranks

References

Petty Officer 2
Military ranks of the United States Coast Guard
United States military enlisted ranks
Marine occupations